Anton Shendrik (born 26 May 1986) is a Ukrainian football defender. He plays for Krymteplytsia Molodizhne in the Crimean Premier League.

Career
Shendrik is a product of his native city SC Tavriya Simferopol youth sportive school system.

He played in different Ukrainian amateur, Second League and First League clubs. In June 2012 Shendrik signed a contract with FC Oleksandriya. In summer 2015 he was promoted to the Ukrainian Premier League together with his club FC Oleksandriya.

References

External links
 Profile at FFU Official Site (Ukr)
 

1986 births
Living people
Sportspeople from Simferopol
Ukrainian footballers
FC Yalos Yalta players
FC Khimik Krasnoperekopsk players
FC Stal Kamianske players
FC Ihroservice Simferopol players
FC Oleksandriya players
FC Hoverla Uzhhorod players
FC Obolon-Brovar Kyiv players
FC Krymteplytsia Molodizhne players
Association football defenders